Widnes is an industrial town within the borough of Halton, in Cheshire, England.

Widnes may also refer to:

 Marie Lovise Widnes (born 1930), Norwegian poet
 Municipal Borough of Widnes, former local government district in Lancashire, England
 Widnes (UK Parliament constituency), a county constituency in England
 Widnes railway station, a Grade II listed building in Cheshire
 Widnes Saints, a rugby league team
 Widnes Vikings, a professional rugby league club